Yenny Álvarez Caicedo (born 24 May 1995) is a Colombian weightlifter. She won the gold medal in the women's 59kg event at the 2022 World Weightlifting Championships held in Bogotá, Colombia. In 2021, she won the silver medal in her event at the World Weightlifting Championships held in Tashkent, Uzbekistan.

She won two gold medals at the 2022 Bolivarian Games held in Valledupar, Colombia. She won the gold medal in her event at the 2022 South American Games held in Asunción, Paraguay.

Achievements

References

External links 
 

Living people
1995 births
Place of birth missing (living people)
Colombian female weightlifters
World Weightlifting Championships medalists
Pan American Weightlifting Championships medalists
Central American and Caribbean Games medalists in weightlifting
Central American and Caribbean Games gold medalists for Colombia
Competitors at the 2014 Central American and Caribbean Games
South American Games gold medalists for Colombia
South American Games bronze medalists for Colombia
South American Games medalists in weightlifting
Competitors at the 2022 South American Games
21st-century Colombian women